Anatoma aupouria is a species of minute sea snail, a marine gastropod mollusc or micromollusc in the family Anatomidae.

Distribution
This species occurs off New Zealand.

References

 Powell A. W. B., New Zealand Mollusca, William Collins Publishers Ltd, Auckland, New Zealand 1979 
 Geiger D.L. (2012) Monograph of the little slit shells. Volume 1. Introduction, Scissurellidae. pp. 1-728. Volume 2. Anatomidae, Larocheidae, Depressizonidae, Sutilizonidae, Temnocinclidae. pp. 729-1291. Santa Barbara Museum of Natural History Monographs Number 7.

External links

Gastropods of New Zealand